Leistville is an unincorporated community in Pickaway County, in the U.S. state of Ohio.

History
A post office called Leistville was established in 1846, and remained in operation until 1902. In 1906, Leistville had between 40 and 50 residents.

References

Unincorporated communities in Pickaway County, Ohio
Unincorporated communities in Ohio